Hylodes is a genus of frogs in the family Hylodidae. It might be paraphyletic with respect to Megaelosia. The genus is endemic to southeastern Brazil. They are also known as the tree toads, or more ambiguously, as torrent frogs. They are diurnal and usually inhabit shallow mountain streams.

Species
The following species are recognised in the genus Hylodes:

References

 
Hylodidae
Amphibians of South America
Endemic fauna of Brazil
Amphibian genera
Taxa named by Leopold Fitzinger
Taxonomy articles created by Polbot